Brandon McDonald (born January 16, 1986 in Glendale, Arizona) is an Guamanian-American soccer player.

Club career

Amateur and college
McDonald was an NSCAA High School All-American while playing for Cactus High School and participated in the annual High School All-America game. In addition, he was in the USA National under-17 pool. Before moving to the University of San Francisco in 2004 McDonald played for the Sereno Golden Eagles youth club with Michael Gavin, Rob Valentino and current teammate Robbie Findley. McDonald played over 50 games for the Dons, finishing second on the team in scoring in his freshman year. He also shared the Stephen Negoesco Award for achievement by an underclassmen in 2004.

During his college years McDonald also played with both the San Francisco Seals and the San Jose Frogs of the USL Premier Development League.

Professional club career

Los Angeles Galaxy 
McDonald was the 46th overall pick in the 2008 MLS SuperDraft, selected by the Los Angeles Galaxy, and made his MLS debut as a substitute in Galaxy's first match of the 2008 season against Colorado Rapids on March 29, 2008. He scored his first MLS goal on October 12, 2008, a 35-yard strike, also against Colorado. The then-rookie shared a locker room with David Beckham and Landon Donovan while taking instruction from Bruce Arena.

San Jose Earthquakes 
After a season in Carson, McDonald moved to San Jose, where the Earthquakes finally gave him the chance to play on a regular basis. McDonald made the most of the opportunity, starting 28 matches in 2010 as the Northern California side advanced to the Eastern Conference Finals. Despite the team's success, improved depth along San Jose's back line made playing time difficult to come by in 2011 and - in need of cap space - the 'Quakes began looking to make a deal involving the talented back. He was waived by the Galaxy in February 2009 and signed with the San Jose Earthquakes on March 20, 2009.

D.C. United 
On June 27, 2011, McDonald was traded to D.C. United from San Jose in exchange for allocation money. He signed a contract extension with D.C. on August 23, 2011. Terms of the new contract were undisclosed.

Real Salt Lake 
McDonald was traded to Real Salt Lake on July 17, 2013 in exchange for a third-round 2014 MLS SuperDraft pick and a conditional pick in the 2015 MLS SuperDraft.  He started three games for the team before being included in RSL's re-entry draft list but was not picked up in the draft.

Ljungskile SK  
In 2014, McDonald signed for Ljungskile SK.

Chainat Hornbill 
In July 2015, he joined Chainat Hornbill for the second half of the 2015 Thai Premier League season. Before moving to Rovers FC (Guam) to play for them a season in 2016.

Penang FA 
In June 2017, McDonald signed for Penang FA, a club in the top division of Malaysian football, the Malaysia Super League. He made his debut against Four time MSL Champions, Johor Darul Ta'zim F.C.

Hanoi FC 
Early in the Vietnamese V.League 1 2019 season, McDonald signed for Hanoi FC.

International career
On December 22, 2009, McDonald received his first call up to train with the senior US national team. In July 2014 McDonald was initially called up for the Guam National Team EAFF Cup training camp but due to schedule conflicts he was unable to attend. McDonald has Guam roots on his father's side.

International goals
Score and Result lists Guam's goals first

Personal life
His sister Jessica McDonald is also a professional soccer player.

References

External links

1986 births
Living people
American soccer players
American expatriate soccer players
Guamanian footballers
Guam international footballers
San Francisco Dons men's soccer players
San Francisco Seals (soccer) players
San Jose Frogs players
LA Galaxy players
San Jose Earthquakes players
D.C. United players
Real Salt Lake players
Ljungskile SK players
Superettan players
Expatriate footballers in Sweden
Soccer players from Arizona
Sportspeople from Glendale, Arizona
Major League Soccer players
USL League Two players
LA Galaxy draft picks
Expatriate footballers in Thailand
Brandon McDonald
Brandon McDonald
Association football defenders